Hui Ka Yan (or Xu Jiayin in Mandarin Chinese), born 9 October 1958, is a Chinese billionaire businessman, Chairman of the board and Communist Party secretary of the Evergrande Group, a Chinese real estate developer.

Hui is the largest shareholder of China Evergrande Group, holding nearly 60 per cent of stock as of December 2021. In 2017, Evergrande Real Estate Group achieved sales of RMB 450 billion (US $69.5 billion). The Guangzhou-based company was China's biggest property developer in 2016, based on sales volume; revenue was 211.4 billion yuan (US$31.8 billion).

As of December 2021, Xu has an estimated net worth of $6.2 billion, making him the 462nd wealthiest person in the world, according to Bloomberg Billionaires Index, down from a peak of $45.3 billion in 2017.

Early life and education
Xu Jiayin was born from a rural family in Jutaigang Village, Gaoxian Township, Taikang County, Henan, on October 9, 1958. His father is a retired soldier who participated in the Second Sino-Japanese War in the 1930s and 1940s. After the establishment of the communist State he became a warehouseman in his home village. Xu's mother died of sepsis when he was 8 months old. He was raised by his paternal grandmother. After high school he worked in a cement product factory for a few days and then worked for two years at home. He was the production team leader. After resuming the college entrance examination in 1978, Xu was accepted to Wuhan Institute of Iron and Steel (now Wuhan University of Science and Technology) serving as commissary in charge of hygiene in his class.

Career
As a fresh graduate in 1982, Xu was assigned to the heat-treatment shop of Wuyang Iron and Steel Company, becoming its associate director in 1983 and director in 1985. Xu served as director for seven years there. After resigning in 1992, he moved to Shenzhen, the newly founded special economic zone in southeast China's Guangdong province. He was accepted by a trading company named "Zhongda". One year later he became president of its branch office named "Quanda". On October 1, 1994, Xu moved to Guangzhou, capital of Guangdong province, to establish the Guangzhou Pengda Industrial Co., Ltd..

In May 1996, Xu Jiayin, with a monthly salary of 2000 yuan, left Zhongda Group after unsuccessful negotiation with the boss of this society.

In March 1997 he founded the Evergrande Group, becoming its chairman. Xu is the owner of Guangzhou Evergrande football club, one of China’s most successful football clubs. in 2019, Xu announced a three-year investment in electric cars worth approximately $6.4 billion.

At its peak of 2017, his fortune is thought to have been $45.3 billion, putting him third on Forbes' 2020 list of Richest Chinese Billionaires. However, from 2017 to 2020 his wealth was estimated to have dropped by more than $20 billion to $21.8 billion due to mounting debts, which were exacerbated by the coronavirus pandemic. The Hurun China Rich List of October 2021 still estimated his personal fortune to be around $11.3 billion in autumn 2021. However, according to the Bloomberg Billionaires Index his net worth had dropped to $6.2 billion by 13 December 2021, having lost $17.2 billion on the year, due partly to the sale of personal assets in the context of the Evergrande liquidity crisis, including his US$227-million mansion in London.

Personal life
Hui married Ding Yumei, whom he met in Wuyang Iron and Steel Company.  The couple have two children and live in Guangzhou.

References

Bibliography
 

1958 births
Living people
Businesspeople from Henan
Chinese billionaires
People from Taikang County
Wuhan University of Science and Technology alumni
Chinese real estate businesspeople
Chinese football chairmen and investors
Chinese company founders
Real estate company founders
Members of the Standing Committee of the 13th Chinese People's Political Consultative Conference
Members of the Standing Committee of the 12th Chinese People's Political Consultative Conference
Members of the Standing Committee of the 11th Chinese People's Political Consultative Conference